San Diego Marine  was a shipbuilding company in San Diego, California. To support the World War 2 demand for ships San Diego Marine built: minesweepers and sub chasers. San Diego Marine was opened in 1915 as San Diego Marine Construction shipyard Captain Oakley J. Hall. The company was sold to Campbell Industries in 1972. It was sold again in 1979 and renamed Southwest Marine.  Boatbuilding ended in 1983. Southwest Marine was sold to U.S. Marine Repair in 2003. The named changed to BAE Systems Ship Repair in 2005. The shipyard is located at 2205 East Belt Street, San Diego.

YMS-1-class minesweeper

San Diego Marine built s for the United States Navy in 1942 and 1943. The ships had a crew of 32. The vessels were armed with one 40 mm gun.

Ships:
YMS-113 (later )
YMS-114 (later 
YMS-115
YMS-116
YMS-143
YMS-144
YMS-145
YMS-146
YMS-281
YMS-282 (later )
YMS-283
YMS-284

PCS-1376-class patrol craft sweeper

San Diego Marine built PCS-1376-class patrol craft sweepers (planned as a submarine chaser) that had displacement of  light, and  full load. Power from two General Motors 8-268A diesel engines with  each.
They used a Snow and Knobstedt single reduction gear to two shafts. They housed complement of 57 officers and enlisted. The patrol craft sweepers were armed with one 3"/50 caliber gun, one 40 mm gun, two 20 mm guns, four depth charge projectors, one Hedgehog anti-submarine mortar and two depth charge tracks.

Built:
PCS-1445
PCS-1446
PCS-1447, renamed YMS-475
PCS-1448, renamed YMS-476

District Patrol Craft
These were built in 1930 and 1931 and taken over by the United States Navy in 1941.
YP-264
YP-236
YP-283
PYc-16, later became a submarine chaser

Landing Craft Mechanized

San Diego Marine built 15 Landing Craft Mechanized (LCM) or "Mike Boat" in 1979. LCMs are river boats and mechanized landing craft. These are used by the United States Navy and Army during the Vietnam War. LCM stands for "Landing Craft Mechanized, Mark 8", a use of the phonetic alphabet, LCM being "Lima Charlie Mike". Power is from two Pak GMC 6-71 or Gray Marine 6-71 diesels paired to two hydrostatic transmissions Detroit 12V-71 diesel engines, with twin screws. LCM have a top speed of  light and  loaded. They were armed with two .50 caliber M2 Browning machine guns.

See also
 California during World War II
 Maritime history of California

References

American Theater of World War II
1940s in California
American boat builders